Jeetige is an Indian Tulu language film directed by Santhosh Mada and produced by A R Productions. This film won 68th National Film Awards in Best Feature Film in Tulu category.

References

Tulu-language films